Double Crossers is a 1921 American short silent Western film directed by William James Craft and featuring Hoot Gibson.

Plot

Cast
 Hoot Gibson
 Marcella Pershing
 John Judd
 Jane Talent credited as Jane Tallent

See also
 List of American films of 1921
 Hoot Gibson filmography

External links
 

1921 films
1921 Western (genre) films
1921 short films
American silent short films
American black-and-white films
Films directed by William James Craft
Silent American Western (genre) films
Films with screenplays by George H. Plympton
1920s American films